There are several kinds of mean in mathematics, especially in statistics. Each mean serves to summarize a given group of data, often to better understand the overall value (magnitude and sign) of a given data set. 

For a data set, the arithmetic mean, also known as "arithmetic average", is a measure of central tendency of a finite set of numbers: specifically, the sum of the values divided by the number of values. The arithmetic mean of a set of numbers x1, x2, ..., xn is typically denoted using an overhead bar, . If the data set were based on a series of observations obtained by sampling from a statistical population, the arithmetic mean is the sample mean to distinguish it from the mean, or expected value, of the underlying distribution, the population mean (denoted  or ).

Outside probability and statistics, a wide range of other notions of mean are often used in geometry and mathematical analysis; examples are given below.

Types of means

Pythagorean means

Arithmetic mean (AM) 
The arithmetic mean (or simply mean) of a list of numbers, is the sum of all of the numbers divided by the number of numbers.

For example, the arithmetic mean of five values: 4, 36, 45, 50, 75 is:

Geometric mean (GM) 
The geometric mean is an average that is useful for sets of positive numbers, that are interpreted according to their product (as is the case with rates of growth) and not their sum (as is the case with the arithmetic mean):
  

For example, the geometric mean of five values: 4, 36, 45, 50, 75 is:

Harmonic mean (HM) 
The harmonic mean is an average which is useful for sets of numbers which are defined in relation to some unit, as in the case of speed (i.e., distance per unit of time):
 

For example, the harmonic mean of the five values: 4, 36, 45, 50, 75 is

Relationship between AM, GM, and HM 

AM, GM, and HM satisfy these inequalities:

Equality holds if all the elements of the given sample are equal.

Statistical location

In descriptive statistics, the mean may be confused with the median, mode or mid-range, as any of these may incorrectly be called an "average" (more formally, a measure of central tendency). The mean of a set of observations is the arithmetic average of the values; however, for skewed distributions, the mean is not necessarily the same as the middle value (median), or the most likely value (mode). For example, mean income is typically skewed upwards by a small number of people with very large incomes, so that the majority have an income lower than the mean. By contrast, the median income is the level at which half the population is below and half is above. The mode income is the most likely income and favors the larger number of people with lower incomes. While the median and mode are often more intuitive measures for such skewed data, many skewed distributions are in fact best described by their mean, including the exponential and Poisson distributions.

Mean of a probability distribution

The mean of a probability distribution is the long-run arithmetic average value of a random variable having that distribution. In all cases, including those in which the distribution is neither discrete nor continuous, the mean is the Lebesgue integral of the random variable with respect to its probability measure. The mean need not exist or be finite; for some probability distributions the mean is infinite ( or ), while for others the mean is undefined.

Generalized means

Power mean
The generalized mean, also known as the power mean or Hölder mean, is an abstraction of the quadratic, arithmetic, geometric, and harmonic means. It is defined for a set of n positive numbers xi by

 

By choosing different values for the parameter m, the following types of means are obtained:

f-mean
This can be generalized further as the generalized -mean
 

and again a suitable choice of an invertible  will give
 {|
|-
|  || arithmetic mean,
|-
|  || harmonic mean,
|-
|  || power mean,
|-
|  || geometric mean.
|}

Weighted arithmetic mean
The weighted arithmetic mean (or weighted average) is used if one wants to combine average values from different sized samples of the same population:

  

In other applications, they represent a measure for the reliability of the influence upon the mean by the respective values.

Truncated mean
Sometimes, a set of numbers might contain outliers (i.e., data values which are much lower or much higher than the others). Often, outliers are erroneous data caused by artifacts. In this case, one can use a truncated mean. It involves discarding given parts of the data at the top or the bottom end, typically an equal amount at each end and then taking the arithmetic mean of the remaining data. The number of values removed is indicated as a percentage of the total number of values.

Interquartile mean
The interquartile mean is a specific example of a truncated mean. It is simply the arithmetic mean after removing the lowest and the highest quarter of values.
 

assuming the values have been ordered, so is simply a specific example of a weighted mean for a specific set of weights.

Mean of a function

In some circumstances, mathematicians may calculate a mean of an infinite (or even an uncountable) set of values. This can happen when calculating the mean value  of a function . Intuitively, a mean of a function can be thought of as calculating the area under a section of a curve, and then dividing by the length of that section. This can be done crudely by counting squares on graph paper, or more precisely by integration. The integration formula is written as:

 

In this case, care must be taken to make sure that the integral converges. But the mean may be finite even if the function itself tends to infinity at some points.

Mean of angles and cyclical quantities
Angles, times of day, and other cyclical quantities require modular arithmetic to add and otherwise combine numbers. In all these situations, there will not be a unique mean. For example, the times an hour before and after midnight are equidistant to both midnight and noon. It is also possible that no mean exists. Consider a color wheel—there is no mean to the set of all colors. In these situations, you must decide which mean is most useful. You can do this by adjusting the values before averaging, or by using a specialized approach for the mean of circular quantities.

Fréchet mean 
The Fréchet mean gives a manner for determining the "center" of a mass distribution on a surface or, more generally, Riemannian manifold. Unlike many other means, the Fréchet mean is defined on a space whose elements cannot necessarily be added together or multiplied by scalars.
It is sometimes also known as the Karcher mean (named after Hermann Karcher).

Trianglar sets 

In geometry, there are thousands of different
definitions for the center of a triangle that can all be interpretted as the mean of a triangular set of points in the plane.

Swanson's rule

This is an approximation to the mean for a moderately skewed distribution. It is used in hydrocarbon exploration and is defined as:

 

where P10, P50 and P90 10th, 50th and 90th percentiles of the distribution.

Other means

Arithmetic-geometric mean
Arithmetic-harmonic mean
Cesàro mean
Chisini mean
Contraharmonic mean
Elementary symmetric mean
Geometric-harmonic mean
Grand mean
Heinz mean
Heronian mean
Identric mean
Lehmer mean
Logarithmic mean
Moving average
Neuman–Sándor mean
Quasi-arithmetic mean
Root mean square (quadratic mean)
Rényi's entropy (a generalized f-mean)
Spherical mean
Stolarsky mean
Weighted geometric mean
Weighted harmonic mean

See also

Central tendency
Median
Mode
Descriptive statistics
Kurtosis
Law of averages
Mean value theorem
Moment (mathematics)
Summary statistics
Taylor's law

Notes

References

 
Moment (mathematics)